Im Namen des Gesetzes is a German television series.
It follows the work of Berlin based criminal police officers and public prosecutors.

Plot 

The series is based on the long-running U.S. television series Law & Order and uses a similar narrated intro and scene change titles.

Mistakes 

The police officers and prosecutors act in the same way the detectives and district attorneys in Law & Order do, although they actually interact different in Germany.
Especially the procedures in court are completely different as it is mainly the judge who questions the defendants and witnesses.

Intro 

Much like Law & Order, every episode starts with a narrated intro.

Die folgende Geschichte beruht auf Tatsachen. Sie schildert die Zusammenarbeit zwischen Polizei und Staatsanwaltschaft bei der Bekämpfung von Straftaten.
Die Staatsanwaltschaft beauftragt die Polizei mit der Aufklärung der Straftaten und klagt die Täter vor Gericht an. Polizei und Staatsanwaltschaft handeln im Namen des Gesetzes.

In English:

The following story is based on actual events. It tells of the co-operation between the criminal police and the prosecutor's office when combating criminality.
The prosecutor's office orders the police to solve crimes and charges the offenders in court. Police officers and prosecutors act in the name of the law.

Characters 

The series follows two officers of the criminal police: one senior detective and one junior detective as well as a senior and a junior prosecutor.
A medical examiner is also frequently featured.

In contrast to most other police procedurals in German television, the audience learns nothing personal about any of the characters.
Neither do they express personal feelings or emotions as it is frequently shown in Law & Order.

While the senior detective remained the same over the course of the series, the junior one changed multiple times.
The prosecutors stayed the same for the first 10 years but afterwards, they changed multiple times as well.

References 
 Production website
 
 :de:Im Namen des Gesetzes (in the German Wikipedia)
 Production website

German crime television series
1990s German police procedural television series
2000s German police procedural television series
1998 German television series debuts
2008 German television series endings
German-language television shows
RTL (German TV channel) original programming